The Institut de Mécanique des Fluides de Toulouse (Institute of Fluid Mechanics of Toulouse, abbreviation IMFT) is a joint research laboratory involving the National Polytechnic Institute of Toulouse (INPT), the French National Centre for Scientific Research (CNRS) and the Paul Sabatier University. The laboratory develops research activities related to the physics of flows.

It is based on an island in the centre of the Garonne river, in Toulouse.

References 

 
 OATAO (Open Archive Toulouse Archive Ouverte)

External links 

Official Website: Institut de Mécanique des Fluides de Toulouse

Research institutes in France